Nils Borring from the Social Democrats was seeking a 4th term as mayor of Favrskov Municipality. The traditional red bloc won just 1 seat more than required in 2017, and therefore the results was expected to be tight.

In a surprise the Conservatives won 6 seats, an increase of 4 compared to 2017. Due to electoral alliances, the Conservatives would win a seat more than Venstre, who on the contrary lost 4 seats. With the Danish People's Party keeping their 1-seat and the The New Right also winning 1 seat, a seat majority between the blue bloc parties had been won. It was later announced that Lars Storgaard would become mayor, and be the first to do so from the Conservatives in Favrskov since the 2007 municipal reform, and he would also become the first mayor from the Conservatives, who had been elected in a municipality from the East Jutland constituency.

Electoral system
For elections to Danish municipalities, a number varying from 9 to 31 are chosen to be elected to the municipal council. The seats are then allocated using the D'Hondt method and a closed list proportional representation.
Favrskov Municipality had 25 seats in 2021

Unlike in Danish General Elections, in elections to municipal councils, electoral alliances are allowed.

Electoral alliances  

Electoral Alliance 1

Electoral Alliance 2

Electoral Alliance 3

Results

Notes

References 

Favrskov